Undurti Narasimha Das (born 1950) shortly Undurti N. Das and U. N. Das is an Indian clinical immunologist, endocrinologist and the founder president and chief executive officer of UND Life Sciences. Additionally, he serves as the Chief Medical Officer and the Chairman of the Scientific Advisory Board of Asha Nutrition Sciences, Inc. An elected fellow of the National Academy of Medical Sciences, Das is known for his researches in the fields of Immunology, Endocrinology and Rheumatology. He holds a number of patents for his work The Council of Scientific and Industrial Research, the apex agency of the Government of India for scientific research, awarded him the Shanti Swarup Bhatnagar Prize for Science and Technology, one of the highest Indian science awards for his contributions to Medical Sciences in 1992.

Biography 

Born to Kameshwari and Undurti Sitarama Swamy on 28 June 1950 at Kakinada, a large city in the south Indian state of Andhra Pradesh, Undurti N. Das graduated in medicine from Andhra Medical College of the Andhra University in 1973. Subsequently, he joined Osmania Medical College as a senior research fellow of the Indian Council of Medical Research and the Council of Scientific and Industrial Research, simultaneously pursuing his higher studies to secure an MD in 1981. He continued at the institution at the Department of Genetics as an ICMR Research Associate, doing his post-doctoral work for 3 years. In 1984, he moved to Canada to join Efamol Research Institute, Kentville, as a scientist, where he stayed for two years, and on his return to India in 1986, he joined Nizam's Institute of Medical Sciences as an associate professor at the department of clinical pharmacology and medical research. He served the institution till 1996, holding the position of a professor from 1990 onward. For the next three years, he was with L. V. Prasad Eye Institute as a professor and the head of the Division of Internal Medicine, Clinical Immunology and Biochemistry. In 1999, he had his second stint abroad, this time in the US, where he chaired EFA Sciences, Norwood as its research director. His service at EFA lasted till 2004, during which period he also served as a research professor of surgery, nutrition, and physiology at the State University of New York Upstate Medical University from 2003 to 2004. That year, he founded UND LIfe Sciences at Shaker Heights, Ohio, a biotechnology company, and became its founder president and chief executive officer. Between 2007 and 2009, he had a brief stay in India as the Research Director of IKP Centre for Technologies in Public Health, Chennai.

Das is married to Lakshmi and the couple has two children, Arundhati and Aditya. He holds the positions of the CEO and research director of UND Life Sciences and is a director of Primrose Biosciences, a Hyderabad-based company involved in research and experimental development in the field of natural sciences and engineering.  

On January 1, 2013, Dr. Das joined Asha Nutrition Sciences, Inc. as the Chief Medical Officer and the Chairman of the Scientific Advisory Board.

Legacy 

Researches of U. N. Das are focused on various disease processes and his researches have revealed the tumoricidal properties of cis-unsaturated fatty acids as well as the role of gamma-Linolenic acid in controlling the progress of glioma, a type of tumor which affects brain and spinal cord. He has also worked on drug development to combat diseases and conditions such as obesity, cancer, diabetes, hypertension and schizophrenia. His researches have been documented by way of several articles; ResearchGate an online repository of scientific articles has listed 500 of them. Besides, he has authored three books, viz. Metabolic Syndrome Pathophysiology: The Role of Essential Fatty Acids, Molecular Basis of Health and Disease and A Perinatal Strategy For Preventing Adult Disease: The Role of Long-Chain Polyunsaturated Fatty Acids. He holds a number of patents for his work, which include "Method of potentiating the action of 2-methoxyoestradiol, statins and C-peptide of proinsulin, Method(s) of stabilizing and potentiating the actions and administration of brain-derived neurotrophic factor (BDNF)
 Method of stabilizing and potentiating the action of anti-angiogenic substances, Method(s) of preventing, arresting, reversing and treatment of atherosclerosis, and Methods for selectively occluding blood supplies to neoplasias and Butyrylcholinesterase as a marker of low-grade systemic inflammation.

Das is the editor-in-chief of Lipids in Health and Disease, a journal published by BioMed Central and Current Nutrition & Food Science, published by Bentham Science. He is the section editor of Medicine journal, a member of the editorial board of the controversial and non-peer reviewed journal Medical Hypotheses and the Journal of Geriatric Cardiology and sits in the scientific advisory board of Techno Scienze Publisher which publishes a number of journals. He is also a member of the editorial review board of Journal of Applied Research in Clinical and Experimental Therapeutics and has been associated with a number of other journals as a member of their editorial boards or the Panel of Reviewers which include World Journal of Diabetes, European Journal of General Medicine, Journal of the Association of Physicians of India, Frontiers in Biosciences, Diabetes Review Letters, Open Colorectal Cancer Journal, Indian Journal of Medical Research and Gene Therapy and Molecular Biology. He has also been a member of the International Advisory Board of the II International Conference on Functional Foods for the Prevention and Treatment of Chronic Diseases, organized by Functional Foods Center, held in November, 2005 at Richardson, Texas;

Awards and honors 
Das, a Ramalingaswamy Re-entry Fellow of the Department of Biotechnology, received the Shakuntala Amirchand Prize of the Indian Council of Medical Research in 1988 and the Council of Scientific and Industrial Research awarded him Shanti Swarup Bhatnagar Prize, one of the highest Indian science awards in 1992. He delivered the Dr. Coelho Memorial Award Oration of Association of Physicians of India in 1992; the same year as he received the Regional Research Award of the Japanese Society of Clinical Chemistry. He also received two minor awards in 1992 viz. Yagnavalki Sangham Award and Distinguished Citizen Award of Pramukh Swamy Maharaj of Aksharadham and the Karnataka Association of Physicians of India awarded him the Bobba Dharma Rao Prize in 1994. In between, the National Academy of Medical Sciences elected him as a fellow in 1992 and the Indian College of Physicians followed suit in 1993. He is also a fellow of the Royal Society of Chemistry, a founder member of Telangana Academy of Sciences and a member of science organizations such as New York Academy of Sciences, American Association for the Advancement of Science and Society for Experimental Biology and Medicine, New York.

Selected bibliography

Books

Articles

Reviews

Patents

See also 

 Neoplasm
 Lipid peroxidation
 Brain-derived neurotrophic factor
 Lipoxins
 Resolvin
 Protectin
 Maresin

Notes

References

External links 
 
 
 
 

Scientists from Andhra Pradesh
Indian medical writers
Indian immunologists
Indian endocrinologists
1950 births
People from Kakinada
Andhra University alumni
Osmania University alumni
Academic staff of Andhra University
State University of New York people
Fellows of the National Academy of Medical Sciences
Fellows of the Royal Society of Chemistry
Recipients of the Shanti Swarup Bhatnagar Award in Medical Science
Living people
20th-century Indian biologists
Academic staff of Nizam's Institute of Medical Sciences